Curia claudenda is an old English writ, used to compel a party to enclose his land.

References

Writs of prevention
Legal documents with Latin names